"Nautical Disaster" is a song by Canadian rock band The Tragically Hip. It was released in February 1995 as the third single from the band's 1994 album, Day for Night. The song peaked at number 26 on the Canadian RPM Singles chart. The song was performed by the band on their 1995 appearance on Saturday Night Live, along with their previous single "Grace, Too".

Background
The song is one of several Tragically Hip singles which were first performed as improvised bridge jams during live performances of the band's signature song "New Orleans Is Sinking". However, many of the lyrics had already been written by 1993: as part of the coverage of the 1993 Another Roadside Attraction festival tour, Gord Downie had agreed to send Toronto Star music writer Peter Howell a postcard from Vancouver to detail his thoughts on the first performance — and the postcard that Downie ultimately sent consisted of most of the lyrics to "Nautical Disaster".

Live performance
In the version which appears on the band's 1997 live album Live Between Us, Downie incorporates a verse from "Bad Time to Be Poor", a song by that concert's opening act Rheostatics, and a verse from Jane Siberry's single "The Temple".

Covers
The song was covered by singer-songwriter Justin Rutledge, both on his 2014 EP Spring Is a Girl and his 2021 album Islands.

Charts

References

1995 singles
The Tragically Hip songs
Songs about World War II
Vehicle wreck ballads
Songs about boats
Songs about oceans and seas
Maritime music
Songs inspired by deaths
German battleship Bismarck